Perth Congregational Church is located in Perth, Perth and Kinross, Scotland. Standing on Kinnoull Street, at its junction with Murray Street, it was completed in 1899. It is now a Category B listed building. The church's architects were Glasgow's Steele and Balfour.

See also

List of listed buildings in Perth, Scotland

References 

Category B listed buildings in Perth and Kinross
Listed churches in Scotland
Congregational Church
1899 establishments in Scotland
Listed buildings in Perth, Scotland